D403 is a state road connecting A7 motorway Škurinje interchange to the centre of the city of Rijeka, and to the Port of Rijeka West terminal.

The D403 state road is scheduled for a reconstruction in order to provide a more efficient connection to the Port of Rijeka, but those plans have been postponed. Currently, D-403 comprises many urban at-grade intersections within the city of Rijeka.

The road, as well as all other state roads in Croatia, is managed and maintained by Hrvatske ceste, state owned company.

Road junctions and populated areas

See also
 Autocesta Rijeka - Zagreb

Sources

State roads in Croatia
Transport in Primorje-Gorski Kotar County